Kayser-Threde GmbH based in Munich, Germany is a systems house specializing in applications in manned and unmanned space missions, optics, telematics, crash test data acquisition, and process control for the rail sector. On September 1, 2014, Bremen-based OHB System AG and Munich-based Kayser-Threde GmbH merged under the name OHB System AG. In this way, the capabilities and capacities of our two outstanding space companies were centralized

Space 
Kayser-Threde has delivered over 100 scientific instruments, systems and sub-systems for manned space stations, satellites and interplanetary missions. Optical systems and subsystems for eight space telescopes and space cameras for astronomical and earth observation have been implemented.

Industrial applications 
Automotive 
Process Control Systems
The automotive and process control applications have their origins in Kayser-Threde’s astronautics activities. Thus, they are examples for transfer of technology spin-off.

References

Aerospace companies of Germany
Companies based in Munich